Sharad Pandey (22 October 1934 — 8 November 2004) was an Indian heart surgeon. He was on the team of surgeons who performed the first-ever heart transplant in India at the King Edward Memorial Hospital and Seth Gordhandas Sunderdas Medical College in Mumbai. He was a specialist in bloodless heart surgery, and was an early exponent of bloodless open heart surgery in India.

Early life and education
Sharad Panday was born on 22 October 1934 in Bombay (now Mumbai), India. A student of Don Bosco High School, Matunga, he completed medicine and Bachelor of Medicine, Bachelor of Surgery at Grant Medical College and Sir Jamshedjee Jeejeebhoy Group of Hospitals, Bombay. Panday moved to Canada to complete his Master of Surgery and Fellowship of the Royal College of Physicians and Surgeons, Canada. Panday was a recipient of the Ontario Heart Foundation fellowship in 1969.

Career
Open heart surgery in India was at a nascent stage in the 1970s and early 1980s. After Panday returned to India from Canada, he joined the King Edward Memorial Hospital and Seth Gordhandas Sunderdas Medical College (KEM), in which he performed hundreds of open heart surgeries. The hospital was run on a government grant and generally catered to the middle class and poor, as the surgery was at the cost of the government. The hospital was one of the very few places in India where heart surgery was performed. Panday was the chief of the second unit at KEM.

On 16 February 1968, after many years of preparation and work with animal models, a team of heart surgeons headed by P. K. Sen and which included Sharad Panday performed the first heart transplant in India–and only the sixth in the world–at KEM.

Bloodless heart surgery was pioneered by American surgeon Denton Cooley. It was also performed by doctor Jerome Kay in Los Angeles and the procedure soon spread around the world. Panday, who trained under the Canadian surgeon Wilfred Gordon Bigelow, adopted the technique and tailored it to Indian conditions. He performed bloodless open heart surgeries at KEM in the 1970s and 1980s. Bloodless heart surgery was cost-effective in India, as it did not require blood transfusions, reduced the chances of infection in case of infected blood, and further reduced postoperative costs. Bloodless heart surgery was also performed on Jehovah's Witnesses, as they refused donated blood.

In 1986 Panday performed a rare heart operation at the Nanavati hospital in Bombay, wherein a large tumor was removed from the left ventricle of a 29-year-old patient. This was the first operation of its kind in India, as tumors in that part of the heart are considered uncommon.

Panday shunt
Panday was known for his ability to improvise, and for wading through knee-deep water to perform surgery. If the water supply at the hospital failed, he would take a  tubing and connect to the garden tap so everybody could scrub up for surgery. This need to improvise and adapt inspired Panday to develop a surgical procedure called the Panday shunt used for mitral valve replacement.

Later years
After retiring from KEM, Panday went into private practice and set up the heart ward at the Nanavati hospital in Mumbai. He was also attached to Breach Candy Hospital and Holy Family Hospital, Mumbai.

Affiliations
With the spread of cardiovascular surgery in India, the annual scientific meeting of the thoracic and cardiovascular surgeons was held independently in 1985 under the new title Association of Thoracic and Cardiovascular Surgeons of India. In 1990 the Indian Association of Cardiovascular-thoracic Surgeons was registered at Bombay. On 15 June 1991, the Association of Thoracic and Cardiovascular Surgeons of India was dissolved through a unanimous resolution passed by its general body during its annual meeting in Bombay, and its entire membership, funds, and assets were transferred to the new Association of Cardiovascular-thoracic Surgeons. Panday was elected as the first president of the latter society on 15 June 1991. The following year, the Fellowship of the Association (F.I.A.C.S) was instituted and regular biannual publication of the Journal of the Indian Association of Cardiovascular-thoracic Surgeons commenced.

Personal life
Panday was married to Snehlata Panday, a physician by profession; the couple had two children, including actor Chunky Pandey. Panday died on 8 November 2004 at his residence in a suburb of Mumbai. After his death, a junction was named after him in the suburb of Bandra, Mumbai.

Published papers
Panday co-authored papers that included:
Clinical and diagnostic features of pulmonary valve endocarditis in the setting of congenital cardiac malformations, published in the International Journal of Cardiology.
Uncommon presentation of choroid plexus papilloma in an infant
Supranational haemangioblastoma without von Hippel–Lindau syndrome in an adult: A rare tumor with review of literature
Cerebral intraventricular echinococcosis in an adult, Bilateral occipital extradural hematoma in a child 
Spinal intradural extramedullary mature cystic teratoma in an adult: A rare tumor with review of literature
High incidence of neural tube defects in Northern part of India
A Prospective Randomized Study Comparing Non-absorb-able Polypropylene' Delayed Absorbable Polyglactin 910 Suture Material in Mass Closure of Vertical Laparotomy Wounds and Bilateral Mirror Image Cervical Neurosurgical in an Adult with Neurotransmitters Type 1
Dorsal spinal epidural psammomatous meningioma in an adult male
Acquired dorsal intraspinal epidermoid cyst in an adult female
Supratentorial haemangioblastoma without von Hippel–Lindau syndrome in an adult: A rare tumor with review of literature
Open-heart surgery, A study of 100 clinical cases, which covered 180 open-heart surgeries from January 1970 to June 1973.

References

Indian transplant surgeons
Indian cardiac surgeons
1934 births
2004 deaths
Medical doctors from Mumbai
20th-century Indian medical doctors
20th-century surgeons